Arche is the beginning or the first principle of the world in the ancient Greek philosophy.

Arche may also refer to:

Arche (mythology), a Muse
Arche (moon), a moon of Jupiter
Arche (album), a 2014 album by Dir En Grey
Arche (oratorio), a composition by Jörg Widmann
Die Arche, a 1919 silent science fiction film by Richard Oswald
Richard Arche, a Canon of Windsor from 1538 to 1553

See also
Archai (disambiguation)
Arch (disambiguation)
Archie (disambiguation)
Château d'Arche, a Bordeaux wine producer of Sauternes
Grande Arche, a monument and building in La Défense, France